Straka (feminine Straková) is a Czech and Slovak surname (meaning magpie). It is a cognate of the Slovene surname Sraka, Polish Sroka, and East Slavic Soroka. It may refer to:

People 
 Andy Straka, American novelist
 Anna Straková (born 1973), Czech long distance runner
 Brandon Straka, American political activist 
 František Straka (born 1958), Czech football manager
 Gábor Straka (born 1981), Hungarian-Slovak footballer
 Helena Straková (born 1975), Czech swimmer
 Iva Straková (born 1980), Czech high jump athlete
 Jakub Straka (born 1997), Slovak footballer
 Jerry Straka, American atmospheric scientist
 Josef Straka (disambiguation)
 Hellmuth Straka (1922–1987), Austrian archaeologist
 Martin Straka (born 1972), Czech ice hockey player
 Mike Straka (born 1969), American television host, author and producer
 Pavol Straka (born 1980), Slovak footballer
 Petr Straka (born 1992), Czech ice hockey player
 Sepp Straka, Austrian golfer
 Tomás Straka (born 1972), Venezuelan historian
 Václav Straka (born 1978), Czech handball player

Other 
Straka Academy, a government building of the Czech Republic

See also
 
 

Czech-language surnames